Gurro is a comune (municipality) in the Province of Verbano-Cusio-Ossola in the Italian region Piedmont, located about  northeast of Turin and about  northeast of Verbania.

Gurro borders the municipalities of Miazzina and Valle Cannobina.

Gurro is said to be populated by the descendants of Scottish soldiers. According to local legend, Scottish soldiers fleeing the Battle of Pavia (24 February 1525)  arrived in the area where severe blizzards forced many, if not all, to give up their travels and settle in the town.  Gurro is proud of its Scottish links. Many residents claim their surnames are Italian translations of Scottish surnames, and the town also has a Scottish museum.

Demographic evolution

References

Cities and towns in Piedmont
Scottish diaspora in Europe